Victorious 2.0: More Music from the Hit TV Show is the second soundtrack and the first extended play for the hit Nickelodeon television series Victorious, with songs performed by Victoria Justice and the Victorious cast.

The album was released on June 5, 2012 by Nickelodeon Records, in association with Sony Music. In Australia, the album was released on November 9 to iTunes and retail stores. To promote the release there, Victoria Justice came to Australia for her first ever Australian Promo Tour, where she visited Melbourne and opened a Victorious fashion line and then traveled to Sydney and Hamilton Island. Prior to the release of the album, "Make It in America" was serviced to Australian radio and media as a single from the soundtrack on November 1, 2012 by Sony Music.

Similar to the show's previous soundtrack, some tracks of this album feature slightly different mixes in comparison with their television counterparts. For example, "Shut Up and Dance" appeared now as a solo performance by Justice in this album, while in the show, other cast members trade verses with her. On the other hand, the song "Countdown" featured more vocalization from Justice on the show than on the actual soundtrack.

Promotion
"Countdown" was released as the promotional single on February 18, 2012. The second promotional single "Take a Hint" was released on March 3, 2012, and became the most successful song from the album and the only to receive a Platinum certification. The only single was "Make It in America", released on May 15, 2012.

Track listing

Charts

Weekly charts

Year-end charts

References

2012 EPs
2012 soundtrack albums
Columbia Records EPs
Columbia Records soundtracks
Television soundtracks
Victoria Justice albums
Victorious